The Italian Greyhound is an Italian breed of small sighthound. It may also be called the Italian Sighthound.

History 

Small dogs of sighthound type have long been popular with nobility and royalty. Among those believed to have kept them are Frederick II, Duke of Swabia; members of the D'Este, Medici and Visconti families; the French kings Louis XI, Charles VIII, Charles IX, Louis XIII and Louis XIV; Frederick the Great of Prussia; Anne of Denmark; Catherine the Great and Queen Victoria. Dogs of this type have often been represented in paintings, notably by Giotto, Sassetta and Tiepolo.

Dogs of this kind were taken in the first half of the nineteenth century to the United Kingdom, where they were known as Italian Greyhounds. The first volume of The Kennel Club Calendar and Stud Book, published in 1874, lists forty of them. The first breed association was the Italian Greyhound Club, founded in Britain in 1900. Registrations by the American Kennel Club began in 1886.

In the nine years from 2011 to 2019, the Ente Nazionale della Cinofilia Italiana recorded a total of 2557 new registrations of the Piccolo Levriero, with a minimum of 213 and a maximum of 333 per year.

Characteristics 

The Italian Greyhound is the smallest of the sighthounds.

It is deep in the chest, with a tucked-up abdomen, long slender legs and a long neck. The head is small; it is elongated and narrow. The gait should be high-stepping and well-sprung, with good forward extension in the trot, and a fast gallop.

The coat may be solid black, grey or isabelline; white markings are accepted on the chest and feet only.

Life expectancy is about 14 years. In the United States, the Ortheopedic Foundation for Animals has found the Italian Greyhound to be the least affected by hip dysplasia of 157 breeds studied, with an incidence of 0.

Use 

Although assigned to the sighthound or hare-coursing groups by the Fédération Cynologique Internationale and the Ente Nazionale della Cinofilia Italiana, the Italian Sighthound is – as it was in the past – kept mostly as a companion dog. It is classified as a toy breed by the American Kennel Club and the Kennel Club of the United Kingdom.

References

Further reading 

 Maria Luisa Incontri Della Stufa (1956). Il piccolo levriero italiano nell'arte e nella storia . Firenze: Sansoni.
 [s.n.] (2004). Le razze italiane . Milano: Ente Nazionale della Cinofilia.

Companion dogs
Dog breeds originating in Italy
FCI breeds
Sighthounds